Ch'iyar Jaqhi (Aymara ch'iyara black, jaqhi precipice, cliff, "black cliff", also spelled Chiar Jakke) is a  mountain in the Andes of Bolivia. It is located in the Oruro Department, Sajama Province, Turco Municipality. Ch'iyar Jaqhi lies east of Qhapaqa and Killaqa.

References 

Mountains of Oruro Department